WFGM may refer to:

WFGM-FM, a radio station (93.1 FM) licensed to Barrackville, West Virginia, United States
WCLG (AM), a radio station (1300 AM) licensed to Morgantown, West Virginia, which held the call sign WFGM from 2019 to 2023
WFGL (AM), a radio station (960 AM) licensed to Fitchburg, Massachusetts, United States, which held the call sign WFGM from 1950 to 1967.
WKKW, a radio station (97.9 FM) licensed to Fairmont, West Virginia, United States, which held the call sign WFGM from 1975 to 1996.
Women's Foundation for Greater Memphis, an organization in Memphis, Tennessee, United States